Robert Fumulani (1948 in Zomba, Malawi – 1998) was a musician, nightclub owner, and businessman in Malawi. He fronted the Likhubula River Dance Band, known for its Afroma ("Afro-Malawi") funk rock reggae fusion.

Biography
Fumulani has been described as "one of Malawi's most popular bandleaders of the late 1980s and 1990s", and as "the blessed father of our national music". He was part of a generation of male singers whose lyrics were about life, but devoid of political content.  In the 1980s he was a three-time winner of Malawi's "Entertainer of the Year" award.

His earnings from music went towards a number of business enterprises, including the Chileka nightclub, Likhubula Entertainment Centre.

References

External links
 Matthew LaVoie, "Musical Sunshine from Malawi", VOA News, February 26, 2008. With links to sound files of three songs performed by Robert Fumulani and the Likhubula River Dance Band.

1948 births
1998 deaths
20th-century Malawian male singers